Hierotheos (1800 – March 28, 1885) was Greek Orthodox Patriarch of Antioch (October 21, 1850 – March 28, 1885).

Literature

External links
 Primates of the Apostolic See of Antioch

1800 births
1885 deaths
Greek Orthodox Patriarchs of Antioch